Two ships of the United States Navy have been named Converse after George Albert Converse, who was noted for his contributions to naval engineering.

 , a  commissioned in 1920 and decommissioned in 1930.
 , a  commissioned in 1942 and decommissioned in 1946; later transferred to Spain as Almirante Valdés (D23); scrapped, 1988

Sources

United States Navy ship names